Roy Robert Rawson (11 May 1898 – 14 June 1971) was an Australian politician.

Early life
He was born at Woods Point to gold miner Robert Rawson and Ellen Smith. From the age of fourteen, he was employed in a Melbourne warehouse, and in 1916 he campaigned against military conscription. From 1916 to 1918 he was a wireless operator for the Royal Australian Navy, and after the war, he managed first a tea room in Bourke Street and then, from 1922, a bookshop in Swanston Street. In April 1925 he married schoolteacher Florence Elizabeth Mitchell, with whom he had one son, political scientist, Don Rawson. His daughter-in-law for a period was classicist Beryl Rawson.

Politics
From 1927 he owned his bookshop in Exhibition Street, where he also ran the headquarters of the Book Censorship Abolition League (1934–36) and subsequently the Australian Council for Civil Liberties. He moved to Upwey in 1951, where he became vice-president of the local Labor Party branch. In 1952, he was elected to the Victorian Legislative Council for Southern Province, and served until his defeat at the 1958 Victorian Legislative Council election. Rawson died at Hawthorn in 1971.

References

1898 births
1971 deaths
Australian Labor Party members of the Parliament of Victoria
Members of the Victorian Legislative Council
20th-century Australian politicians
Royal Navy personnel of World War I
Military personnel from Victoria (Australia)